New St. Eleftherios Church is a church near the Opera House in Bucharest, Romania. It is located at 1 Saint Elefterie Street and was designed by the architect Constantin Iotzu. This is the new church, as there is an older church by the same name nearby. It was named after the Saint Eleftherios.

Gallery

References 

Historic monuments in Bucharest
Church buildings with domes
Romanian Orthodox churches in Bucharest
Churches completed in 1971